Ryan Murray (born 30 March 1998) is a Zimbabwean cricketer. He made his Twenty20 debut for Zimbabwe against Free State in the 2016 Africa T20 Cup on 9 September 2016. Prior to his Twenty20 debut, he was part of Zimbabwe's squad for the 2016 Under-19 Cricket World Cup.

He made his List A debut for Zimbabwe A against Afghanistan A during Afghanistan's tour to Zimbabwe on 29 January 2017. He made his first-class debut for Rising Stars in the 2017–18 Logan Cup on 12 November 2017. In January 2018, he was named in Zimbabwe' One Day International (ODI) squad for the tri-series in Bangladesh, but he did not play.

In June 2018, he was named in a Board XI team for warm-up fixtures ahead of the 2018 Zimbabwe Tri-Nation Series. Later the same month, he was named in a 22-man preliminary Twenty20 International (T20I) squad for the tri-nation series. The following month, he was named in Zimbabwe's One Day International (ODI) squad for their series against Pakistan. He made his ODI debut for Zimbabwe against Pakistan on 13 July 2018.

In September 2018, he was named as the vice-captain of Zimbabwe's squad for the 2018 Africa T20 Cup tournament.

References

External links
 

1998 births
Living people
Zimbabwean cricketers
Zimbabwe One Day International cricketers
Rising Stars cricketers
Place of birth missing (living people)